Giuliano de' Medici di Ottajano, 15th Prince of Ottajano (born 25 September 1974) is an Italian noble, belonging to Neapolitan Ottajano branch of the House of Medici.

Biography 
A member of a cadet branch of the Medici family, he is the son of Giovanni Battista de' Medici di Ottajano (1939–2015) and his wife, Gilda Tucci. Giuliano is the President of the International Medici Association.

References 

Giuliano
1974 births
21st-century Italian people
Living people